The Miss Pennsylvania Teen USA competition is the pageant that selects the representative for the state of Pennsylvania in the Miss Teen USA pageant. This pageant is independently conducted and produced by Proctor Productions based in Cincinnati, Ohio. It was produced by Sanders & Associates, Inc., dba- Pageant Associates based in Buckhannon, West Virginia from 2001 to 2020.

Pennsylvania has been reasonably successful at Miss Teen USA. Their best decade was the 1990s, when they ranked fifth-equal in terms of number and value of placements . All but three of this state's placements came in the 1990s, with only one placement in the 1980s and two in the 2000s. The placement in 2000 was their best, however, when Jillian Parry captured the Miss Teen USA crown.

Three Pennsylvania teens have crossed over to win the Miss Pennsylvania USA title and compete at Miss USA.

Alexandra Jones of Monongahela was crowned Miss Pennsylvania Teen USA 2022 on April 24, 2022 at Richland Performing Arts Center in Johnstown. She will represent Pennsylvania for the title of Miss Teen USA 2022.

Results summary

Placements
Miss Teen USAs: Jillian Parry (2000)
1st runners-up: Patricia Campbell (1996)
2nd runners-up: Ursula Abbott (1993), Sydney Robertson (2014)
3rd runners-up: Yvonne Burke (2021)
Top 6: Susan Barnett (1990)
Top 10: Diane Hoyes (1983)
Top 12: Nicole Bigham (1994)
Top 15: Elliot Griffin (2008), Madison Longstreth (2011), Jasmine Daniels (2015)
Pennsylvania holds a record of 11 placements at Miss Teen USA.

Awards
Best State Costume: Melissa Forlini (1986)
Miss Congeniality Sydney Robertson (2014)

Winners 

1 Age at the time of the Miss Teen USA pageant

References

External links
Official website

Pennsylvania
Women in Pennsylvania